Pilila Mwanza Getrude Jere is a Zambian politician who is the Member of Parliament for Lumezi.

References

External links 

 Biography at the Zambian Parliament

Living people
Independent politicians
Members of the National Assembly of Zambia
21st-century Zambian women politicians
21st-century Zambian politicians
Year of birth missing (living people)